The Department of Environment and Conservation (DEC) was a department of the Government of Western Australia that was responsible for implementing the state's conservation and environment legislation and regulations. It was formed on 1 July 2006 by the amalgamation of the Department of Environment and the Department of Conservation and Land Management.

The DEC was separated on 30 June 2013 forming the Department of Parks and Wildlife (DPaW) and the Department of Environment Regulation (DER), which both commenced operations on 1 July 2013.

On 1 July 2017 the DER amalgamated with the Department of Water and the Office of the Environmental Protection Authority, to become the Department of Water and Environmental Regulation, while DPaW was merged with other agencies to form the Department of Parks and Wildlife.

Status (at dissolution, 30 June 2013)
The department was managing more than 285,000 km2, including more than nine per cent of WA's land area: its national parks, marine parks, conservation parks, regional parks, state forests and timber reserves, nature reserves, roadside reserves and marine nature reserves. It provided visitor and recreation facilities at a sustainable level for many of these.

It also supported or worked closely with the following authorities:
Environmental Protection Authority
Conservation Commission of WA
Keep Australia Beautiful
Marine Parks and Reserves Authority
Swan River Trust
Waste Authority

The total reportable visitation to DEC-managed lands and waters during the 2012-13 financial year was 16.02 million, with visitor satisfaction levels of 88%.

4,717 people were registered volunteers with the department in 2012-13 that helped in a range of projects across the state with 564,350 hours contributed.

DEC was responsible from 2007 to 2013 for protecting and conserving the state of Western Australia's environment; this included managing:
 State forests (1,304,442 ha)
 99 national parks (6,246,692 ha)
 16 conservation parks (847,578 ha)
 13 marine parks (2,206,612 ha)
 1 marine nature reserve (132,000 ha)
 nature reserves (10,244,167 ha)

At 30 June 2013, the total area under Department of Environment and Conservation's care was 28,531,987 ha.

The department's key responsibilities also included roles in managing, regulating and assessing aspects of the use of the state's natural resources and biodiversity, including the regulation of native vegetation clearing and pollution control. The department initiated 14 environmental prosecutions during 2012–13, involving a broad range of charges including pollution, unauthorised clearing of native vegetation and illegal dumping. At 30 June 2013, eight environmental prosecutions remained before the courts. There were an additional 18 pending cases that, subject to the evidentiary standard being met, could result in prosecution or other sanction.

DEC was also responsible for the wildlife conservation project Western Shield.

The department was also in charge of wildfire prevention and suppression on its land as well as fire prevention in unallocated Crown land.

The indicative burn target for 2012–13 in the south-west forest regions was 200,000 hectares. In 2012–13, DEC achieved 23,468 hectares in the south-west forest regions, including about 6,410 hectares that were burnt for pine plantation protection.

The combination of unsuitable weather conditions, fuels remaining dry due to summer conditions extending into autumn, and enhanced requirements in prescribed burn planning and risk management as a result of the 2011 Margaret River bushfire contributed to a significant reduction of the area able to be prescribed burnt this year.

The average area of burning achieved over the past 10 years has been about 163,019 hectares per annum.

A further 6,023,884 hectares was burnt in the Kimberley, Pilbara, Goldfields, Midwest, Wheatbelt and South Coast regions. The burns were carried out on DEC-managed lands as well as on unallocated Crown lands and unmanaged reserves within these regions.

DEC staff attended and monitored 676 bushfires throughout the state in 2012–13, which burnt about 5,477,394 hectares. The causes of these fires were:
 lightning—28 per cent (above the 10-year average of about 24 per cent)
 deliberately lit or arson-caused fires—37 per cent (below the 10-year average of about 43 per cent)
 accidental fires—16 per cent
 escapes from private burns—4 per cent
 escapes from DEC burns—0 per cent
 other causes—4 per cent
 unknown—11 per cent.

Some of the most severe bushfires the department had to suppress, in chronological order, included:

Preceding agencies
National parks (and the earlier forms) in Western Australia were under: 
 Department of Lands and Surveys: 1 January 1890 – (partly split) 31 December 1895
 Wood and Forests Department: 1 January 1896 – 31 December 1918
 Forests Department: 1 January 1919 – 21 March 1985
 State Gardens Board:    15 December 1920 – 30 April 1957  (Parks and Reserves Act 1895)
 National Parks Board:    1 May 1957 – 30 July 1977
 Department of Fisheries and Fauna: 1 October 1964 – 31 December 1973
 National Parks Authority:       1 August 1977 – 15 April 1985  (National Parks Authority Act 1976)
 Wildlife section of the Department of Fisheries and Wildlife: 1 January 1974 – 21 March 1985
 Department of Environment: 1 July 2004 - 30 June 2006
 Department of Conservation and Land Management:     22 March 1985 – 30 June 2006  (Conservation and Land Management Act 1984)

Vehicles
The department maintained and coordinated a range of specialist equipment and emergency response vehicles. This included pumpers, water bombers and tankers and other equipment relating to operations involving search and rescue and firefighting.

See also
Australasian Fire and Emergency Service Authorities Council

References

External links
 Department of Environment and Conservation
 Department of Parks and Wildlife (Western Australia)
 Department of Environment Regulation

Nature conservation in Western Australia
Forests of Western Australia
2006 establishments in Australia
Western Australia
Environment
2013 disestablishments in Australia
Environmental agencies in Australia